Adnation in Angiosperms is the fusion of two or more whorls of a flower, e.g. stamens to petals". This is in contrast to connation, the fusion among a single whorl.

References

Plant anatomy